James Edward Caulfeild, 8th Viscount Charlemont, PC (NI), DL (12 May 1880 – 20 August 1949) was an Irish Peer, elected to the British House of Lords as a Representative Peer and to the Parliament of Northern Ireland as a Senator. He sat in Stormont's upper house from 1925 to 1937 and was Minister for Education for all but the first of his years.

Lord Charlemont was born in London to an Irish family, son of the Hon. Marcus Caulfeild, CB, and Gwyn Williams (granddaughter of Sir Robert Williams, Bart.). Educated at Winchester, he married twice; firstly to Evelyn Hull of Park Gate House, Surrey and secondly in 1940 to Hildegarde Slock-Cottell of Belgium.

Lord Charlemont lived at Newcastle, County Down. He was the first President and co-founder of The Irish Association for Cultural, Economic and Social Relations.

He inherited the Viscountcy of Charlemont and Barony of Caulfeild from his uncle in 1913. Having no children, the titles passed on his death to his cousin.

References

1880 births
1949 deaths
James
Irish representative peers
Northern Ireland Cabinet ministers (Parliament of Northern Ireland)
Members of the Privy Council of Northern Ireland
Members of the Senate of Northern Ireland 1925–1929
Members of the Senate of Northern Ireland 1929–1933
Members of the Senate of Northern Ireland 1933–1937
Ulster Unionist Party members of the Senate of Northern Ireland
Viscounts Charlemont